VOEPASS Linhas Aéreas previously known as Passaredo Linhas Aéreas is an airline based in Ribeirão Preto, São Paulo, Brazil. It operates regional services in Brazil. Its main base is Dr. Leite Lopes Airport, Ribeirão Preto.

According to the National Civil Aviation Agency of Brazil (ANAC), between January and December 2019 Passaredo had 0.3% of the domestic market share of revenue passenger kilometers (RPK), making it the fifth largest domestic airline in Brazil.

History
The Passaredo bus transport company, owned by Viação Passaredo, started regional aircraft operations in 1995. Following a suspension of operations in April 2002, it restarted operations in 2004. It is wholly owned by Grupo Passaredo.

From 2010 until 2014, Passaredo had an operational partnership with GOL Linhas Aéreas, replacing an earlier similar agreement with TAM Airlines (now LATAM Airlines). However, in 2014, Passaredo re-established an operational partnership with TAM (now LATAM). In January 2017, Passaredo re-established operational partnership with GOL Linhas Aéreas on selected flights, while maintaining partnership with LATAM.

Passaredo applied to the Commercial Bankruptcy and Reorganization Court in Ribeirão Preto on October 19, 2012, for the commencement of "judicial reorganization" proceedings pursuant to the New Bankruptcy and Restructuring Law of Brazil (Law 11.101). Operations continue as normal.

In the year 2014 Passaredo along with Avianca, was considered the safest of Brazil in a ranking of AirlineRatings.com, receiving seven star rating. The staff evaluated 449 airlines to security criteria. A total of 149 evaluated airlines got seven stars, the highest score.

On July 3, 2017, company was sold to Viação Itapemirim but on September 11, 2017, Passaredo resigned the sale to Itapemirim for breach of contract.

On August 21, 2019, Passaredo announced the purchase of MAP Linhas Aéreas, including the 12 slots at São Paulo–Congonhas Airport granted to MAP on August 14. Passaredo was granted 14 slots. Together these slots will help Passaredo to build its own network from Congonhas Airport, focusing on markets underserved or not served. Initially both companies will operate independently but there are plans for a future merger.
On the same day Passaredo also announced the change of its name to VOEPASS Linhas Aéreas.

On June 8, 2021 GOL Linhas Aéreas announced the purchase of MAP Linhas Aéreas from VOEPASS. The transaction included 26 slots at São Paulo–Congonhas Airport belonging to MAP and VOEPASS. The Amazonian operations and aircraft of MAP were transferred to VOEPASS.

In October 2021, Voepass announced its fleet increase, with Boeing 737-700 and 737-800. The airline plans to operate with them in larger cities, like Curitiba and Porto Alegre.

On November 3, 2022, the airline became a member of the International Air Transport Association. And two days later, on November 5, 2022, joined the Latin American & Caribbean Air Transport Association (ALTA).

Destinations
As of January 2023 VOEPASS Linhas Aéreas operated scheduled services to the following destinations in Brazil. Destinations include those operated on behalf of GOL Linhas Aéreas and operated by MAP Linhas Aéreas:

Fleet

VOEPASS Linhas Aéreas fleet consists of the following aircraft (as of November 2022):

Accidents and incidents
On August 25, 2010, Passaredo Linhas Aéreas Flight 2231, operated by an Embraer ERJ-145, crashed on approach to Vitória da Conquista. The plane landed short of the runway and the crew lost control, severely damaging the aircraft before it came to a stop away from the runway. Two of the twenty-seven people on board were injured. The airline said the plane was unable to lower landing gear, although observers said the landing gear was down while the aircraft was landing.

See also
List of airlines of Brazil

References

External links 

Airlines of Brazil
Airlines established in 1995